is a software engineer specializing in high performance, hand-written, machine code.

Education
Goto was a research associate at the Texas Advanced Computing Center at the University of Texas at Austin when he wrote his famously hand-optimized assembly routines for supercomputing and PC platforms that outperform the best compiler generated code. 

Several of the fastest supercomputers in the world still use his implementation of the Basic Linear Algebra Subprograms (BLAS) known as GotoBLAS.

Career
In 2010, Goto joined Microsoft's Technical Computing Group with the title of Senior Researcher. 

In July 2012, he joined Intel with the title of Software Engineer. 

Goto continues to write hand-optimized machine code, utilizing detailed knowledge of the architecture to which he has access.

References

Further reading
  (25 pages) 
  
 

Japanese computer programmers
Living people
Year of birth missing (living people)